Franz Haupert (27 October 1907 – 30 June 1996) was a Luxembourgian gymnast. He competed in eight events at the 1936 Summer Olympics.

References

1907 births
1996 deaths
Luxembourgian male artistic gymnasts
Olympic gymnasts of Luxembourg
Gymnasts at the 1936 Summer Olympics
People from Käerjeng
20th-century Luxembourgian people